Helen Farnsworth Mears (December 21, 1872 – February 17, 1916) was an American sculptor.

Early years
Mears was born December 21, 1872, in Oshkosh, Wisconsin, daughter of John Hall Mears and  Elizabeth Farnsworth Mears (pen names "Nellie Wildwood" and "Ianthe", called the first Wisconsin poetess ) and youngest sister to Louise and Mary Mears. Mears studied at the State Normal School in Oshkosh, and art in New York City. In New York, she studied under Augustus Saint Gaudens for two years and worked as his assistant before heading to Paris in 1895 to continue working with Denys Puech (sometimes Puesch), Alexandre Charpentier, and Frederick MacMonnies.

Career 
Her first success, before any formal art training, was "Genius of Wisconsin", a work commissioned by the State of Wisconsin when she was just 21. The work was exhibited in the Wisconsin Building at the World's Columbian Exposition in 1893. The  marble sculpture was executed by the Piccirilli Brothers. It is now housed in the Wisconsin State Capitol. Both she and sculptor Jean Pond Miner were named "artists in residence" at the Wisconsin Building, and that is where she created The Genius of Wisconsin, while Miner produced Forward.

Mears was one of a group of women sculptors christened the "White Rabbits" who worked under Lorado Taft producing sculpture for the World Columbian Exposition.

In 1907, Mears, and her sister, writer Mary Mears, were the first colonists at MacDowell Colony.

Important works 
Her most important works include a marble statue of Frances E. Willard (1905, Capitol, Washington) that is included in the National Statuary Hall Collection; portrait reliefs of Edward MacDowell (Metropolitan Museum, New York); and Augustus St. Gaudens; portrait busts of George Rogers Clark and William T.G. Morton, M. D. (Smithsonian Institution, Washington). In 1904, her "Fountain of Life" (St. Louis Exposition) won a bronze medal. She made New York her residence and exhibited there and in Chicago.

Statue of Wisconsin 
In 1910, George B. Post, the architect of the Wisconsin State Capitol then being designed, attempted to secure the services of the well-known sculptor Daniel Chester French to create a statue of Wisconsin to be placed on top of the dome. French, having as much work as he desired, turned the commission down, and Post recommended Mears for the job. With the belief that she had the contract, she began working on a model; she ultimately created three models, with two of them receiving feedback from the commission. By August 1911, Post suggested that Mears could not complete the design in their time frame, and the commission ultimately selected French to complete the sculpture. Mears was paid $1,500 for the work that she had already done, but the loss of the commission was a shock from which she never recovered.

Death 
Following the debacle surrounding the Wisconsin Capitol statue, Mears's health declined, as did her financial well-being. She died of heart disease on February 17, 1916, at the age of 43. At the time of her death, she was working in her studio at 46 Washington Square South, in Greenwich Village.

Gallery

References

Further reading 

 
 Rubenstein, Charlotte Streifer. American Women Sculptors. G. K. Hall & Co., Boston 1990.

External links
 
 Helen Farnsworth Mears entry at the Museum of Wisconsin Art

1872 births
1916 deaths
American women sculptors
Sculptors from Wisconsin
People from Oshkosh, Wisconsin
University of Wisconsin–Oshkosh alumni
Artists from New York City
19th-century American sculptors
20th-century American sculptors
20th-century American women artists
19th-century American women artists
Sculptors from New York (state)